— (born November 24, 1979) is a Japanese kickboxer and Muay Thai World Champion.

Martial arts career
Shibata won the ISKA World Muay Thai Flyweight title in 2001, with a third round KO over Karen Williams.

Shibata was scheduled to fight Semma Yerlice during the WCK event in Las Vegas. She won the fight by a second round TKO.

Sachiko retired from professional sports in 2007, following a knee injury.

Titles
WIKBA World Muay Thai Super Flyweight Champion
ISKA World Jr Flyweight Champion
WMTA  World Flyweight Champion

Kickboxing record

|-  style="background:#cfc;"
| 2008-01-12|| Win ||align=left| Sema Yerlice || WCK: Muay Thai || Las Vegas, United States || TKO || 2 || 2:38
|-  style="background:#cfc;"
| 2005-02-05|| Win ||align=left| Ilonka Elmont || WORLD CHAMPIONSHIP MUAY THAI  || Las Vegas, United States || Decision (Split) || 3 || 3:00
|-  style="background:#cfc;"
| 2001-7-8|| Win ||align=left| Karen Williams || Xplosion 2: Xplosion On Jupiters || Gold Coast, Australia || KO  || 3 
|-
! style=background:white colspan=9 |
|-
| colspan=9 | Legend:

Boxing record

External links
Sachiyo Shibata Awakening Profile
womenkickboxing

References

1979 births
Living people
Japanese women boxers
Japanese female kickboxers
People from Saitama Prefecture
Sportspeople from Saitama Prefecture